Elten is a German village located in North Rhine-Westphalia. It has a population of around 4,500. Since 1975, it has been part of the town of Emmerich am Rhein. Between 1949 and 1963, Elten was part of the Netherlands (see Bakker-Schut Plan). There is a substantial minority of Dutch citizens.

Hochelten is part of Elten and is situated on the Elterberg.

Gallery

External links 
www.erholungsort-elten.de (German Source) 

Villages in North Rhine-Westphalia
Former municipalities in North Rhine-Westphalia